The 2015 ATP Challenger Tour Finals was a tennis tournament played at the Esporte Clube Pinheiros in São Paulo, Brazil, between 25 and 29 November 2015. It was the fifth edition of the event, which serves as the season ending championships for players on the ATP Challenger Tour.

Points

Qualified players
On 10 November 2015, ATP editor Josh Meiseles confirmed the final list of 8 players on the ATP World Tour official website.
  Daniel Muñoz de la Nava
  Íñigo Cervantes
  Paolo Lorenzi
  Farrukh Dustov
  Radu Albot
  Marco Cecchinato
  Guido Pella
  Guilherme Clezar

Day-by-day summary
All times listed below are in Brasília Summer Time (UTC−02:00).

Round robin

Day 1 (25 November)

Day 2 (26 November)

Day 3 (27 November)

Semifinals (28 November)

Final (29 November)

Champion

 Íñigo Cervantes def.  Daniel Muñoz de la Nava, 6–2, 3–6, 7–6(7–4)

See also
2015 ATP Challenger Tour
2015 ATP World Tour Finals
2015 WTA Tour Championships

References

External links
 Official website

ATP Challenger Tour Finals
2015
2015 in Brazilian tennis